The Breda–Eindhoven railway is an important railway line in the Netherlands running from Breda railway station to Eindhoven railway station, passing through Tilburg railway station and Boxtel railway station. The line was opened between 1863 and 1866. It is part of the Staatslijn "E".

Stations
The main interchange stations on the Breda–Eindhoven railway are:

Breda: to Roosendaal and Rotterdam
Tilburg: to 's-Hertogenbosch and Nijmegen
Boxtel: to 's-Hertogenbosch
Eindhoven: to 's-Hertogenbosch, Utrecht, Venlo and Maastricht

Railway lines in the Netherlands
Railway lines in North Brabant
Transport in Breda
Rail transport in Eindhoven
Transport in Tilburg
Railway lines opened in 1866
Regional rail in the Netherlands